Heliozela is genus of moths of the family Heliozelidae. It was described by Gottlieb August Wilhelm Herrich-Schäffer in 1853.

Species

 Heliozela aesella
 Heliozela ahenea
 Heliozela anantia
 Heliozela angulata
 Heliozela anna
 Heliozela argyrozona
 Heliozela autogenes
 Heliozela biprominens
 Heliozela brevitalea
 Heliozela castaneella
 Heliozela catoptrias
 Heliozela crypsimetalla
 Heliozela cuprea
 Heliozela eucarpa
 Heliozela glabrata
 Heliozela gracilis
 Heliozela hammoniella
 Heliozela isochroa
 Heliozela limbata
 Heliozela lithargyrella
 Heliozela macrocerella
 Heliozela microphylla
 Heliozela nephelitis
 Heliozela praeustella
 Heliozela prodela
 Heliozela resplendella
 Heliozela rutilella
 Heliozela sericiella
 Heliozela siderias
 Heliozela sobrinella
 Heliozela subpurpurea
 Heliozela trisphaera

References

External links
 

Heliozelidae
Adeloidea genera
Taxa named by Gottlieb August Wilhelm Herrich-Schäffer